Polton is a village located in Lasswade parish, Midlothian, Scotland, anciently a superiority of the Ramsay family, cadets of Dalhousie. In 1618 David Ramsay of Polton was in possession. (See: Analecta Scotica, Edinburgh, 1834).

Notable residents
 Thomas de Quincey the English writer, lived here in the latter part of his life, until his death in 1859.
 Charles Thomas Clough an eminent geologist, lived at St Ann's Mount, Polton with his family

See also
Polton railway station
Esk Valley Railway (Scotland)

External links

Vision of Britain - History of Polton in Midlothian

Villages in Midlothian
Bonnyrigg and Lasswade